Like most states of the African Sahel, Chad has suffered desertification—the encroachment of the desert. Traditional herding practices and the need for firewood and wood for construction have exacerbated the problem. In the early 1980s, the country possessed between 135,000 and 160,000 square kilometres of forest and woodlands, representing a decline of almost 14% from the early 1960s. To what extent this decline was caused by climatic changes and to what extent by herding and cutting practices is unknown. Regulation was difficult because some people traditionally made their living selling wood and charcoal for fuel and wood for construction to people in the urban center. Although the government attempted to limit wood brought into the capital, the attempts have not been well managed, and unrestricted cutting of woodlands remained a problem.

See also

Agriculture in Chad
Economy of Chad

References

Chad
Economy of Chad
Agriculture in Chad
Chad